Gill Pinnacle (or Gill's Pinnacle) is an inselberg located in the far east of Western Australia, on the Ngaanyatjarra Lands. It's part of the Petermann Ranges. It consists of a dome-shaped hill, surrounded by dense mulga; its top is bare rock. The hill has been useful as a landmark, because it marks the location of one of the area's most reliable freshwater rockholes, Gordon's Springs. This is located a few hundred metres to the north of the rock. 

The area is called  (also spelled  or ) in Pitjantjatjara and Ngaanyatjarra.

The first European people to visit the area were the explorers Ernest Giles and W. H. Tietkens, in 1874. They saw the rock from Weld Pass, which is further to the west. Giles named the rock after his brother-in-law, and the waterhole, Gordon's Springs, after his nephew.

See also
Mount Augustus, Western Australia

References

Inselbergs of Western Australia
Goldfields-Esperance